Caliendrula elstoni is a species of sea snail, a marine gastropod mollusk in the family Clavatulidae.

Description
The shell grows to a length of 35 mm.

Distribution
This marine species occurs off Transkei & KwaZulu-Natal, South Africa.

References

 Kilburn, R.N. (1985). Turridae (Mollusca: Gastropoda) of southern Africa and Mozambique. Part 2. Subfamily Clavatulinae. Ann. Natal Mus. 26(2), 417–470

External links
 

Endemic fauna of South Africa
elstoni
Gastropods described in 1962